Nordhofen is an Ortsgemeinde – a community belonging to a Verbandsgemeinde – in the Westerwaldkreis in Rhineland-Palatinate, Germany.

Geography

The recognized tourist community of Nordhofen lies on the abandoned stretch of the Westerwaldbahn (railway) between Siershahn and Altenkirchen in the heart of a mountainous landscape wooded with beeches and spruces. The community belongs to the Verbandsgemeinde of Selters, a kind of collective municipality. Its seat is in the like-named town.

History
In 1259, Nordhofen had its first documentary mention. In 1357, Emperor Karl IV granted Count Wilhelm of Wied the right to expand Nordhofen into a town. He received the right “to be allowed to build with stones, put together, lay out and make into a walled town the village and its layout with moats, walls, towers, oriels, gates, and other things as he can and likes to do, without anyone’s hindering or speaking against it”. Owing to the absence of the natural conditions for a town location, the town of Nordhofen could not be properly developed. Hence, in 1653, Emperor Ferdinand III transferred the town rights from Nordhofen to the more favourable location of the new settlement of Neuwied at the request of the then Count Friedrich of Wied. In 1972, in the course of municipal restructuring, the Verbandsgemeinde of Selters was founded, to which Nordhofen belongs.

Religion
To the Evangelical parish belong the communities of Nordhofen, Mogendorf, Vielbach and Quirnbach. Until 1851, Selters and the surrounding villages also belonged to the parish.

Politics

The municipal council is made up of 12 council members, as well as the honorary and presiding mayor (Ortsbürgermeister), who were elected in a majority vote in a municipal election on 13 June 2004.

Economy and infrastructure

Transport
The nearest Autobahn interchange is Mogendorf on the A 3 (Cologne–Frankfurt). The nearest InterCityExpress stop is the railway station at Montabaur on the Cologne-Frankfurt high-speed rail line.

Clubs
Over the last few decades, a lively club life has developed.

References

External links
Verbandsgemeinde of Selters 

Municipalities in Rhineland-Palatinate
Westerwaldkreis